Acta Crystallographica is a series of peer-reviewed scientific journals, with articles centred on crystallography, published by the International Union of Crystallography (IUCr). Originally established in 1948 as a single journal called Acta Crystallographica, there are now six independent Acta Crystallographica titles:

Acta Crystallographica Section A: Foundations and Advances
Acta Crystallographica Section B: Structural Science, Crystal Engineering and Materials
Acta Crystallographica Section C: Structural Chemistry
Acta Crystallographica Section D: Structural Biology
Acta Crystallographica Section E: Crystallographic Communications
Acta Crystallographica Section F: Structural Biology Communications

Acta Crystallographica has been noted for the high quality of the papers that it produces, as well as the large impact that its papers have had on the field of crystallography. The current six journals form part of the journal portfolio of the IUCr, which is completed by the Journal of Applied Crystallography, the Journal of Synchrotron Radiation, the open-access  IUCrJ and the open-access data publication IUCr Data.

History

Acta Crystallographica was established in conjunction with the foundation of the International Union of Crystallography in 1948. Both were established to maintain an international forum for crystallography after the Second World War had led to a loss of international subscription to, and the eventual nine-year closure of, the main pre-war crystallography journal, Zeitschrift für Kristallographie. The founding editor of Acta Crystallographica was P. P. Ewald, who wrote in the preface to the first issue  A steady increase in the number of submitted papers led to the journal being split into Section A, covering fundamental and theoretical studies, and Section B, dedicated to reports of structures, in 1968, together with a new journal, the Journal of Applied Crystallography. In 1983, Section C, devoted to the crystal structures of small molecules, was added, with Section B now focusing on biological, chemical, mineralogical and metallurgical crystallography. The rapid expansion in biological crystallography led to the launch of Section D in 1993. The journals launched online versions in 1999, and in 2000 the journals began to provide electronic article submission and subscription access online. This was followed by the launch of an online-only journal, Section E, for brief reports of new small-molecule structures, in 2001; this journal became fully open access in 2008. A second online-only journal, Section F, dedicated to short reports of macromolecular structures and reports on their crystallization, followed in 2005. The IUCr moved to online-only publication for all its journals from 2014.

Journals

Acta Crystallographica Section A: Foundations and Advances

Acta Crystallographica Section A: Foundations and Advances is the foundation on which the whole suite of IUCr crystallography journals are built, containing papers describing fundamental developments in crystallographic theory and practice. When Acta Crystallographica was split into two sections in 1967, Section A was named Acta Crystallographica Section A: Crystal Physics, Diffraction, Theoretical and General Crystallography. The journal's name changed again in 1982 to Acta Crystallographica Section A: Foundations of Crystallography. The journal adopted its current title in 2013.

Abstracting and indexing
The journal is abstracted and indexed in:

Acta Crystallographica Section B: Structural Science, Crystal Engineering and Materials

Acta Crystallographica Section B: Structural Science, Crystal Engineering and Materials publishes scientific articles on structural science. According to the journal: "Knowledge of the arrangements of atoms, including their temporal variations and dependencies on temperature and pressure, is often the key to understanding physical and chemical phenomena and is crucial for the design of new materials and supramolecular devices." It was formed in 1968 when the journal Acta Crystallographica was split into two parts and has been published for the International Union of Crystallography under the following titles:
Acta Crystallographica. Section B: Structural Crystallography and Crystal Chemistry (Acta Crystallogr. B Struct. Cryst. Cryst. Chem., print ) from its formation until the end of 1982.  It was published in Denmark by Munksgaard and accepted articles in English, French, and German.
On the launch of Acta Crystallographica Section C in 1983, the title of Section B changed to Acta Crystallographica Section B: Structural Science (Acta Crystallogr. B Struct. Sci., print ), and the publisher was changed to Wiley-Blackwell in 2004 after Wiley had acquired Munksgaard.
From the start of 2013, the title was changed to the present Acta Crystallographica Section B: Structural Science, Crystal Engineering and Materials (Acta Crystallogr. B Struct. Sci. Cryst. Eng. Mater., print ) and the journal now only publishes in English.

Abstracting and indexing
The journal is abstracted and indexed in:

Acta Crystallographica Section C: Structural Chemistry

Acta Crystallographica Section C: Structural Chemistry is a journal for the rapid publication of research with structural content relating to the chemical sciences.

Abstracting and indexing
The journal is abstracted and indexed in:

Acta Crystallographica Section D: Structural Biology

Acta Crystallographica Section D: Structural Biology publishes articles covering all areas of structural biology, including biomolecular structures determined by NMR and cryo-EM as well as crystallography, and the methods used to obtain them. The journal was launched in 1993 as Acta Crystallographica Section D: Biological Crystallography with Jenny Glusker as the founding Editor. In 2003, Ted Baker and Zbigniew Dauter took over the editorship of the journal. The current Editors are Elspeth Garman, Randy J. Read and Charles S. Bond. In 2016, the title was changed to Acta Crystallographica Section D: Structural Biology to reflect the expanded scope of the journal.

Abstracting and indexing
The journal is abstracted and indexed in:

Acta Crystallographica Section E: Crystallographic Communications

Acta Crystallographica Section E: Crystallographic Communications is an open-access structural communications journal. It reports crystal structure determinations of inorganic, metal-organic and organic compounds. Since 2012, Acta Crystallogr. E has not been included in the Science Citation Index.

Abstracting and indexing
The journal is abstracted and indexed in:

Acta Crystallographica Section F: Structural Biology Communications

Acta Crystallographica Section F is a rapid structural biology communications journal. It publishes short papers on biological structures and any aspects of structural biology.

Abstracting and indexing
The journal is abstracted and indexed in:

References

External links
 IUCr journals official site

Chemistry journals
Publications established in 1948
English-language journals
Wiley-Blackwell academic journals
Monthly journals
Bimonthly journals
Online-only journals
Academic journals associated with learned and professional societies